Morton House, also known as Morton Mansion, is a historic home with Queen Anne style located at Webster Springs, Webster County, West Virginia that dates to 1912. It is a massive red brick dwelling set on a solid stone foundation, with a hipped roof and features a pair of -story turrets and each is topped with a conical shingled roof and capped with wooden finials. It also has a wraparound porch around 3/4 of the house.

It was the home of Eskridge H. Morton (1866-1940) a prominent local attorney and elected official in the West Virginia State Government.

It was listed on the National Register of Historic Places in 1986.

References

Houses on the National Register of Historic Places in West Virginia
Queen Anne architecture in West Virginia
Houses completed in 1912
Houses in Webster County, West Virginia
National Register of Historic Places in Webster County, West Virginia
1912 establishments in West Virginia